Positive is a 1990 documentary film directed, written and produced by Rosa von Praunheim (in cooperation with Phil Zwickler). The film received international resonance.

Plot
Positive is about how the gay community in New York City and its activists deal with the AIDS crisis. The film's protagonists include Larry Kramer and Diamanda Galás.

Production notes
Positive is the first part of Rosa von Praunheim's AIDS-Trilogy.

Awards
1990: Queer Film Prize of the Berlin International Film Festival (together with Silence = Death)

Reception
The Guardian wrote in 1992: "Silence = Death and Positive: The best AIDS films to date [...]." The Los Angeles Times summed it up: "In short, Praunheim is just the man for the job he has taken on with Silence = Death and Positive: he has the breadth of vision, the compassion and the militance and, yes, the sense of humor necessary to tackle the AIDS epidemic in all its aspects."

Notes

References 
 Kuzniar, Alice A, The Queer German Cinema, Stanford University Press, 2000, 
Murray, Raymond. Images in the Dark: An Encyclopedia of Gay and Lesbian Film and Video Guide to the Cinema of Spain. TLA Publications, 1994,

External links

1990 films
1990 documentary films
German documentary films
West German films
Documentary films about HIV/AIDS
Films directed by Rosa von Praunheim
1990s English-language films
HIV/AIDS in American films
HIV/AIDS in German films
1990s German films
English-language German films